NGC 6239 is a barred spiral galaxy located in the constellation Hercules with a distinct core. It is designated as SB(s)B in the galaxy morphological classification scheme and was discovered by the German-born British astronomer William Herschel on 12 April 1788. The galaxy is approximately 42 million light years away from Earth.

See also 
 List of NGC objects (6001–7000)

References

External links 
 

Barred spiral galaxies
Hercules (constellation)
6239
10577
59083